Alfonso Ocampo-Chavez (born March 25, 2002) is an American professional soccer player who plays as a forward for Major League Soccer club Austin FC.

Club career
Ocampo-Chavez was raised in Merced, California to Mexican parents, playing in the Merced Atlas Soccer Academy program. He signed a contract in 2016 to join the Seattle Sounders FC Academy at the age of 14, shortly after entering the U.S. youth national team system and training with the national under-14 team.

He was transferred to the Sounders' under-17 team and played in the Generation Adidas Cup, scoring four goals against other MLS academy teams. Ocampo-Chavez made his professional debut on July 8, 2017, playing for USL club Seattle Sounders FC 2 on July 8, 2017 in a 4–1 defeat to Real Monarchs. He was signed to a full-time USL contract with the team in August 2018. In the 2019 Generation Adidas Cup, he led the Sounders team to the final by scoring six goals in five matches, including a hat-trick against the West Ham United Academy in the semifinal.

Ocampo-Chavez signed a first-team MLS contract with the Sounders on May 1, 2019, after making three appearances for the Tacoma Defiance.

On July 17, 2021, he was loaned to FC Pinzgau Saalfelden.

Following the 2022 season, Ocampo-Chavez was released by Seattle. On November 17, 2022, his MLS rights were claimed by Austin FC off the waivers list. On November 29, 2022, he signed a one-year deal with Austin.

International career
In October 2019, Ocampo-Chavez was named to the United States squad for the 2019 FIFA U-17 World Cup in Brazil.

Ocampo-Chavez who has only played for U.S. youth national teams, also holds the option to be called up by Mexico.

Career statistics

Club

Honors
Seattle Sounders FC
MLS Cup: 2019

References

External links

USSF Development Academy bio (demosphere)
 

2002 births
Living people
People from Merced, California
Soccer players from California
American expatriate soccer players
American soccer players
American sportspeople of Mexican descent
Association football forwards
Expatriate footballers in Austria
Major League Soccer players
USL Championship players
Tacoma Defiance players
Seattle Sounders FC players
Homegrown Players (MLS)
United States men's youth international soccer players
MLS Next Pro players
Austin FC players